Douglas Kent Hall (December 12, 1938 – March 30, 2008) was an American writer and photographer. Hall was a fine art photographer and writer of fiction, poetry, nonfiction, essays, and screenplays. His first published photographs were of Jimi Hendrix and Jim Morrison, and his first exhibition of photographs was at the Whitney Museum of American Art.

Hall published twenty-five books, including two with Arnold Schwarzenegger. His photographs often cover subjects such as rock and roll musicians, rodeo, cowboys, prison, flamenco, bodybuilders, the U.S.-Mexico border, the American West, New Mexico, New York City, Japan, Brazil, Mexico, Great Britain, Greece, Russia, Native Americans, writers, and artists. Hall's artistic output included collaborations with Larry Bell, Bruce Nauman, Terry Allen, and his son Devon Hall.

In 2008, following Hall's death, solo exhibitions of his photographs hung concurrently at the Harwood Museum of Art, Taos, New Mexico; the Riva Yares Gallery, Santa Fe, New Mexico; and the Roswell Museum and Art Center, Roswell, New Mexico.

Early life and education
Hall was born in Vernal, Utah, to Phyllis Hiatt and Charles William "Peck" Hall. He was the oldest of two children. While Peck Hall was serving in the Navy during World War II, his marriage to Phyllis broke up and the two boys started living with their maternal grandmother, Beulah Perry. Hall's elementary and high school years were spent with his grandparents on rural farms in the Vernal area. He raised sheep and cows that he exhibited and sold at County Fairs. During high school Hall was a rodeo contestant.

At the age of seventeen, Hall entered Utah State University, Logan, to study creative writing. He transferred to the University of Utah in Salt Lake City and then to Brigham Young University where he earned his bachelor's degree in English in 1960. At BYU Hall started lifelong friendships with Alfred L. Bush and David Stires. Bush became the Curator of Western Americana at the Firestone Library, Princeton University, and Stires became a publishing executive. Hall's undergraduate years included study of the creative process with Brewster Ghiselin, editor of the book The Creative Process. Hall met and married Claire Nicholson of Boise, Idaho between his junior and senior years at BYU. The two remained married for ten years. Hall was accepted into the Writer's Workshop at the University of Iowa. For three years he worked as special assistant to Paul Engle, director of the program. While at the Writer's Workshop Hall befriended, among others, Mark Strand, Galway Kinnell, W. S. Merwin, Robert Bly, and Adrian Mitchell. Hall wrote and published while at Iowa.

Early career
In 1963 Hall commenced a position at the University of Portland teaching Creative Writing and Literature. Hall and Claire moved to Portland, Oregon, in 1964. During his time at the University of Portland, Hall brought poets to the school for readings, including Allen Ginsberg, W. H. Auden, Anaïs Nin, Gary Snyder, Robert Duncan, William Stafford, and Robert Bly. Hall also became active in an organization called American Writers Against the Vietnam War. At this time a friend lent Hall a camera and he taught himself photography, studying photographic technique and style. He photographed poets and the group of artists he befriended in Portland, including Lee Kelly, Carl Morris and Hilda Morris.

Hall's increasing interest in photography led to freelance photographic work. He photographed Jimi Hendrix and Jim Morrison of the Doors for Sunn Music, makers of amplifiers. He received commercial and magazine photographic assignments and realized he could dedicate himself to his writing and photography and left the world of academia.

In 1967 Hall traveled throughout England, France, Italy, Spain, Morocco, and Portugal with his cameras. He shot his first images in the Dark Landscapes series. In 1968 Hall moved from Portland to London and continued work in advertising and on his series of artist and writer portraits and his art photography. He began formulating the idea of Passing, which dominated most of the philosophy behind his personal work.

Writing and photography career
Hall and his wife moved from London to New York City in 1968. He continued to photograph rock and roll stars, which resulted in the publication of Rock: A World Bold as Love, released later in paperback as The Superstars: In Their Own Words. In New York, Hall continued writing. He published his first novel, On the Way to the Sky, in 1972. This book fictionalized Hall's childhood years in Vernal, Utah, and his relatives. Hall's time spent in the world of rock and roll led to his novel Rock and Roll Retreat Blues, published in 1974.

While driving across the country with Alfred Bush in 1969, Hall shot his first Passing series. In 1971 he developed the first negatives for Passing II. The idea of time and the photograph continued to deepen and became the guiding influence behind his total photographic output.

Hall's marriage to Claire dissolved in 1970. He returned briefly to Portland, Oregon, and worked doing commercial photography jobs and writing. He met his future second wife, Dawn Claire Davidson, a fashion coordinator, in May 1971. The following December the two moved to New York and set up residence and studio in a loft on 21st Street and 7th Avenue.

In the 1970s Hall lived in New York but spent much time traveling. His work included writing a book about rodeo titled Let Er Buck; writing and codirecting a feature documentary film about rodeo titled The Great American Cowboy, which won an Academy Award for Best Feature-Length Documentary; and publishing a photography book titled Rodeo, which was followed in the early 1980s by another book about cowboys, this one about ranch cowboys, titled Working Cowboys. Mark Strand writes, "These cowboys, as opposed to urban cowboys, drugstore cowboys, rodeo cowboy, or movie cowboys, stay on horseback all day long working cattle. And when they stand in front of the camera—in Hall's best photos, they are standing, looking straight into the camera lens—their detached way of life shows." The 1970s also saw the publication of Hall's second novel, Rock and Roll Retreat Blues. In 1974, Hall exhibited his photographs for the first time, at the Whitney Museum of American Art in New York. The exhibition and accompanying catalog, Photography in America, is where the public first viewed his photograph Mesquite, Texas.

During the latter half of the 1970s and the early 1980s, Hall worked on books collaboratively. In 1975 Hall's literary agent, Bob Dattila, asked him if he would be interested in working on a project with bodybuilder Arnold Schwarzenegger. Hall and Schwarzenegger published two books, Arnold: The Education of a Bodybuilder and Arnold's Bodyshaping for Women. Arnold: The Education of a Bodybuilder was on the New York Times Best Seller list for eleven weeks in 1978. In 2002, Sports Illustrated included the Hall/Schwarzenegger collaboration as number 71 on their "Top 100 Sports Books of All Time". During the writing and photographing of Bodyshaping for Women, Hall became acquainted with female bodybuilder Lisa Lyon; the friendship led to the publication of their Lisa Lyon's BodyMagic. The Incredible Lou Ferrigno, with bodybuilder Lou Ferrigno, rounded out Hall's collaborative publishing ventures with bodybuilders.

In 1977 Hall and his partner moved from New York to the village of Alcalde, New Mexico. After living together for more than six years, they were married in Santa Fe on July 23, 1977. In 1980 their son Devon was born.
 
Hall traveled throughout the Southwest and along the Mexico-U.S. border in the 1980s gathering material for two photographic books. The Border: Life on the Line introduced Hall to the varied types of people who live and work on both sides of the border. The book includes many color photographs. Frontier Spirit: Early Churches of the Southwest also includes many color images.

Most well known for his silver prints, in 1992 Hall began printing with platinum. Also in the early 1990s, Hall traveled to Saint Petersburg, Russia, to document the Hermitage Museum's art school for children. He photographed in the students' homes and at the museum. During this period Hall also traveled to Minas Gerais, Brazil, to document the region's gold and gemstone miners.

In the mid-1990s Hall began producing one-of-a-kind photographic artworks. His Zen Ghost Horses series are images of Peruvian Paso and Clydesdale horses exposed onto handmade paper that was brushed with emulsion. Hall embellished the works with gold leaf, Chinese and Japanese calligraphy, and acrylics. Taking color images shot along the Mexico-U.S. border, Hall created a suite of artes de caja (art boxes). These pieces incorporate color photograph, poems, milagros, objects picked up while traveling the border, and pages from Mexican graphic novelettes into and on hand-painted wooden wine boxes. The Albuquerque Museum showed fifteen of the border boxes for four months as part of a tribute exhibition for Hall in 2008.

After being awarded the New Mexico Governor's Award for Excellence in the Arts in 2005, Hall's In New Mexico Light, a compilation of his images taken over a forty-year time span, was published by the Museum of New Mexico Press.

In 2002, Hall's first collection of poems was published in Visionary. The book also contains an extended automemoir/poem.

Martial arts
Hall began studying and practicing Kaju Kenpo karate in Santa Fe in 1986, receiving his Nidan black belt in 1998. He taught karate in Española, New Mexico until 2002. While continuing to practice karate, Hall also incorporated Tai Chi into his daily spiritual practice. When photographer Joyce Tenneson selected Hall in 2004 for inclusion in her book Amazing Men, she photographed him working with martial arts weapons.

Death
Hall died suddenly at his home in Albuquerque on March 30, 2008; the cause of death was described as "a cardiac incident." He was survived by his wife, Dawn, and son, Devon Hall, a composer and pianist.

Writing 
Hall's first writing was fiction. His first novel, On the Way to the Sky, is set in Utah and explores themes that surface frequently in his work: small-town life, surviving a broken home, Mormonism, hunting and fishing, music, and rodeo. Writer Mag Dimond asked Hall in 1997 which of his books were his favorite and why. "His first choice was On the Way to the Sky, the book he wrote when he was about twenty-one, a steely, sweet autobiographical novel he didn't publish until almost six years later. About this book he simply says, 'I was able to define my past, get it behind me where it belongs.' . . . This stunning little novel is rich in characters suggested by real people . . . written in startlingly original language." The New York Times Book Review noted, "Mr. Hall invents distinctive family backgrounds for his three heroes and arranges them into an impressionistic chronicle." In Rock and Roll Retreat Blues, his second novel, the humor is sardonic; it is a commentary on the world of rock and roll and the culture it creates and drives. According to a Publishers Weekly review, "The book is chock-full of familiar contemporary figures—Hells Angels, revolutionaries, people spaced out on religion or brown rice or drugs, even such exotics as the "plaster casters." Yet Hall is fresh and funny, and he makes Artie's [the protagonist's] search for his own psyche very real and very much a part of our times. (Excerpts ran in Penthouse)." The third novel, The Master of Oakwindsor, set in 1908 England, explores the clash between rural England and a new and darker industrial Britain and between two families. Bestseller magazine writes, "After three successful novels and an Academy Award–winning screenplay, it is no surprise that Hall's novel brings a fresh outlook to the overworked genre of historical romance. The Master of Oakwindsor is a diverse and brilliantly colored portrait of England and Europe at the turn of the century, bristling with event and detail."

Hall's numerous books of nonfiction, which include his photographs, treat various subjects, including rock and roll, rodeo, cowboy life, bodybuilding, prison, the historic churches of the Southwest, and the border between the United States and Mexico. "The Border, about desperate lives lived on both sides of the United States–Mexico border, is at once a compelling piece of work, a lucid and personal rendering of Hall's own border experiences both in words and 'pictures.'" Let 'Er Buck is "a really deep look at rodeo and some rodeo people. Most of us have seen what goes on in the arena; this book mostly deals with the rest of it. . . . What [Hall] has said with his typewriter and his camera is bound to be controversial." About Hall's book In New Mexico Light, Bill Richardson, governor of New Mexico, wrote: "the thoughtful text in this book [is] testimony to the work of an artist who has dedicated his life to observing the rich cultural texture of New Mexico." In New Mexico Magazine, Jon Bowman writes, "Hall accompanies the images [in In New Mexico Light] with some of the most lucid, engaging essays on the photographic process you'll ever read. He's a straight-shooter all the way. There's no mention of f-stops or arcane technical knowledge, but rather some fine storytelling, mixing in roughly equal doses of the sacred and the profane."

Photographs 
Many of Hall's images have become known as icons of Americana, such as Mesquite, Texas 1973, and Jim Morrison, Portland. Princeton University curator Alfred L. Bush writes: "Unlike the majority of the photographic explorers, who are continually clicking away at the American West, Douglas Hall's camera is firmly rooted in the region's very center." Hall's photographs are mainly of people; the protagonist in the Sam Shepard story "San Juan Bautista" says: "I'm more into faces—people; Robert Frank, Douglas Kent Hall, guys like that." Hall finds his subjects worldwide, from New York to the Southwest, from Russia to Japan, Brazil to Mexico, as well as in places like Morocco and the Outer Hebrides Islands. On the occasion of the exhibition  in Santa Fe of Os Brasileiros (The Brazilians), David Bell notes, "Hall, who has recently made several trips to Brazil and the Amazon, takes as his subjects not only the miners who were his first objective but families, farmers . . . and students, too. The result is a composite portrait of a people who in most cases appear to give themselves with equal abandon to the camera and to life." He continued to work in film and branched into digital imagery, shooting both color and black-and-white. Hall crossed the digital photography boundary by moving into fine art color photographs printed on handmade watercolor paper. Mark Strand noted in Vogue Magazine, "There is nothing provisional about Hall's enterprise; it is both broad and, in individual photographs, scrupulously resolved. His pictures have an edge, a magical certainty about them that not only justifies but also honors their subjects, no matter how odd or how exploited." Writing about Hall's 2007 book In New Mexico Light, Dave Gagon notes, "A filmmaker and poet, as well as a photographer, Hall has photographed and written about New Mexico's unique mix of places and people, a broad representation including ancient sites and Spanish churches, Indian ceremonial dances, portraits of artists and writers, viejos and vagabonds. He invigorates his 182 black and white photographs with descriptive prose—something most visual artists have difficulty achieving." In his foreword to In New Mexico Light actor/playwright Sam Shepard writes, "The photographs in this book are naked impressions of the mind and spirit just waiting for somebody as lucky and gifted as Douglas Kent Hall to hunt them down and seize them with a little black box." When discussing the complex relationship of a photograph to history, Hall noted to the author of Photography: New Mexico, Kristin Barendsen, "that a photograph imparts the illusion of permanence, when in fact the scene depicted no longer exists. What's more, he said, the photograph does not represent exactly what its maker saw. It takes on a life of its own, and because each viewer experiences it differently, the image reflects an essence of the viewer. 'That's not my photograph,' he said, pointing to his most famous image, Mesquite, TX, hanging in his studio. 'It belongs to the viewer.'"

Transition to digital photography
Hall started out with a 35mm camera, added a 2 square format camera, and kept working with those two formats using Nikons, Leica Cameras, and Hasselblads. In the mid-1990s he added digital cameras to his arsenal. In a Rangefinder magazine article, Hall said to author/photographer Paul Slaughter: "I am using a Nikon D70s digital SLR and I always carry a Nikon point-and-shoot that fits into my pocket. It does interesting things to the color (which I like). I also use an Olympus C-5050 digital camera that has a wonderful f/1.8 lens. My new series, Travel, is all digital color and I am fascinated by the images because they are different from anything I've done before. The creative part is the same, the tools are the tools—the cameras." Hall had five external hard drives full of images and did his best to keep them organized. He said to Slaughter, "I am a bit haphazard in my approach to work. I am more intuitive than anything else. That is part of my imagery evolvement." Hall used the Adobe  Photoshop and Lightroom software programs for after-capture processing and did his own printing, both digital and traditional. He had four Epson inkjet printers. For digital printing he favored watercolor papers as they render a softer image. He told Slaughter: "I am often upset that I can no longer readily find traditional printing supplies. . . . That concerns me more than thinking about where photography is going. I look at the photographs being done and feel that the new digital work is less convincing than film work. But I feel certain that photographers such as Edward Weston would have brought a special look to digital. I hope I am doing the same. In the end, with either digital or film, I choose what pleases my eye. I think the world of professional photography is much like it has always been, full of challenge."

Archives
Hall's papers are held at Princeton University Library, Rare Books and Special Collections. The collection, which is open to researchers, comprises 93 linear feet, 101 boxes.

Awards 
J. Marinus Jensen Short Story Contest, Brigham Young University, 1959
Academy Award for Best Documentary Feature, Great American Cowboy, 1974
Honorary Chair, College of Notre Dame's Sister Catherine Julie Cunningham visiting scholar award. Fine Arts Department, College of Notre Dame, San Francisco, Spring 1997
Distinguished Alumnus of Uintah High School, Vernal, Utah, 1999
New Mexico Governor's Award for Excellence in the Arts, 2005
Medici Gold Medal Career Award, Florence Biennale Internazionale Dell'Arte Contemporanea, 2005
Finalist, New Mexico Book Awards, art books, for In New Mexico Light, 2008

Quotations
The camera, the split-second blink of the shutter, taught me that time does not pass. It is we who pass. We pass through time and we waste only ourselves. Time is indifferent to us and to our folly. Time remains the one certainty we have, the fixed and constant factor-more concrete than life, more permanent than space.

Works

Books 
Rock: A World Bold As Love (1970) 
The Superstars: In Their Own Words (1970) 
On the Way to the Sky (1972) 
Let 'Er Buck! (1973) 
Rock and Roll Retreat Blues (1974) 
Rodeo (1975) , 
The Master of Oakwindsor (1976) 
Ski with Billy Kidd (1976) 
Van People: The Great American Rainbow Boogie (1977) ,  (pbk.)
Arnold: The Education of a Body Builder (with Arnold Schwarzenegger) (1977) 
Bodyshaping for Women (with Arnold Schwarzenegger) (1979) 
Bodymagic (with Lisa Lyon) (1981) , 
The Incredible Lou Ferrigno (1982) 
Working Cowboys (1984) 
The Border: Life on the Line (1988) 
In Prison (1988) 
Passing Through: Western Meditations of Douglas Kent Hall (1989) 
Frontier Spirit: Early Churches of the Southwest (1990) 
New Mexico: Voices in an Ancient Landscape (1995) 
Prison Tattoos (1997) , 
Albuquerque 2000 (2000)
The Thread of New Mexico (2001) 
Visionary (2002) 
Noches Perdidas, 2003
In New Mexico Light (2007) 
City Light: Douglas Kent Hall's New York, forthcoming

Films 
The Great American Cowboy, screenplay and narration
Wheels of Fire, director and screenplay
Arnold and Maria, interviewee, E! Network, 2003
Arnold Schwarzenegger: Hollywood Hero, interviewee
In the Spirit of Crazy Horse, screenplay (with Justin Ackerman)
The Great Joe Bob, screenplay, based on a song by Terry Allen
Sirens, photographer
Fool for Love, photographer
Roosters, photographer
Tattoo Nation, still photographs
Robert Bly: A Thousand Years of Joy, A Film by Haydn Reiss, still photographs

Photography
Public collections
Atlantic Richfield, Dallas, TX, and Los Angeles, CA
Center for Southwest Research, University of New Mexico, Albuquerque, NM
Chase Manhattan Bank, New York, NY
The Doan Collection, Fort Dodge, IA
Fannin National Bank, Houston, TX
Wells Fargo Bank, Los Angeles, CA
Steve Gold, Inc., New York, NY
Ovenwest Corporation, Albuquerque, NM
The Albuquerque Museum, Albuquerque, NM
Amarillo Museum of Art, Amarillo, TX
Sheldon Museum of Art, Lincoln, NE
Philadelphia Museum of Art, Philadelphia, PA
Princeton University Library, Princeton, NJ
Princeton University Art Museum, Princeton, NJ
Millicent Rogers Museum, Taos, NM
Bibliothèque nationale de France, Paris
Blue Cross Blue Shield, Albuquerque, NM
New Mexico Museum of Art (formerly the Museum of Fine Arts), Santa Fe, NM
El Paso Museum of Archaeology, El Paso, TX
Roswell Museum and Art Center, Roswell NM
New Mexico State University Art Museum, Las Cruces, NM
Blue Cross Blue Shield, Philadelphia, PA
Midwestern State University, Wichita Falls, TX
Brooklyn Museum, Brooklyn, NY
The Museum of Fine Arts, Houston, Texas
Hotel Erwin, Venice Beach, CA, two collections
Mobil Oil Corporation, Dallas, TX
Rose Art Museum, Brandeis University, Waltham, MA
City of Phoenix, AZ
New Mexico State Capitol, Santa Fe, NM
Museum of the American West, Autry National Center, Los Angeles, CA
McAllen International Museum, McAllen, TX
The Martin Foundation, San Francisco, CA
Star Canyon, Las Vegas, NV
Albuquerque International Sunport Collection, NM
Princess Cruise Line, CA
University of New Mexico, Los Alamos, NM
University of New Mexico Art Museum, Albuquerque, NM
University of New Mexico, HSC Art Collection, NM
Panhandle Plains Historical Museum, Canyon, TX
Regency Hotel, Hong Kong, China
University of California, Los Angeles, Arts Library, CA
Harwood Museum of Art, Taos, NM
Palace of the Governors, New Mexico History Museum, Santa Fe, NM
National Museum of African American History and Culture, a Smithsonian Institution, Washington, DC

Notable photographs
Mesquite, Texas
Jimi Hendrix Seattle
Taos Man
Bareback Rider
Tina Turner
Andy Warhol at the Factory
Arnold Schwarzenegger
Horse, La Villita
Generations, Navajo
Sandia
Jim Morrison, Portland
Calf Roping, Pendleton
Picuris Man
Bell Spur
Paris, 1980

Other books, catalogs, and portfolios about Hall or with contribution by Hall
"James Joyce at 71: Rue du Cardinal Lemoine," essay by Douglas Kent Hall, Brigham Young University Studies 3, nos. 3–4 (Spring–Summer 1961): pp. 43–49.
Photography in America, New York, Random House, 1974, pp. 246–47. 
"Love of Traction," essay by Douglas Kent Hall. Esquire, September 1976, p. 76.
"Van Art," essay and photographs by Douglas Kent Hall. Esquire, September 1977, p. 115.
Boundary 2: A Journal of Postmodern Literature, Binghamton, NY, 1982
The Cowboy, New York, Stewart, Tabori, & Chang, 1983, pp. 226–27. 
Princeton University Library Chronicle, vol. XLIV, Spring 1983, portfolio of Matachines photographs
Photoflexion, New York, St. Martin's Press, 1984
Third Western States Exhibition, New York, The Brooklyn Museum; Santa Fe, Western States Arts Foundation, 1986, Library of Congress Catalogue No. 85-052333
3 / Photographers: Douglas Kent Hall, Bruce Berman, and Roger Manley, Roswell Museum and Art Center, NM, 1986
Images of Spirit and Vision, Santa Fe, NM, Museum of New Mexico Press, 1987, p. 74. 
Die Gleichzeitigkeit des Anderen, Stuttgart, Germany, Verlag Gerd Hatje, 1987
Way Out West, Tokyo, Japan, Treville Publishing Co., 1990, 21 pages.  C0072
Electric Gypsy, London, England, Heinemann and Heinemann, 1990, color p. xv. 
Zero Mass, The Art of Eric Orr, Stockholm, Sweden, Propexus, 1990, pp. 284–85. 
Esquire/Japan, Working Cowboys and Artist Profile, Tokyo, Japan, July 1991
Southwest Profile, Portfolio of Fourteen Photographs; Santa Fe, NM, August, September, October 1991
Southwest Profile, Portfolio of Nine Photographs, Santa Fe, NM, November, December, January 1991/1992
The Jimi Hendrix Concerts, Bella Godiva Music, Inc., 1991, pp. 18, 36, 96, 122, 154. 
Radio One, Hendrix, Bella Godiva Music, Inc., 1991, all photographs. 
The Doors: The Complete Lyrics, A Delta Book, 1992, pp. 88, 93, 105, 110, 166.  
Imago, vols. 3–5, Japan, Portfolio, 1992
Walking Swiftly, edited by Thomas R. Smith, HarperPerennial, 1992, photograph of Robert Bly, p. 73. 
Chaco Past, Boxed Portfolio of Douglas Kent Hall photographs of Chaco Canyon, 1992
Chaco Future, Boxed Portfolio of Douglas Kent Hall photographs of Chaco Canyon, 1992
Photographer's Forum, Exclusive magazine interview and portfolio of eight photographs, November 1992
a simple story (Juárez), Terry Allen, Ohio State University, Wexner Center, 1992
The Photograph and the American Indian, by Alfred L. Bush and Lee Clark Mitchell, Princeton University Press, 1994 
The Paintings of William Lumpkins, "William Lumpkins in Roswell," catalog essay, Roswell Museum and Art Center, NM, 1995
Understanding Art, Fourth Edition, by Lois Fichner-Rathus, Prentice Hall, 1995
It's Only Rock and Roll: Rock and Roll Currents in Contemporary Art, by David S. Rubin, Munich, Prestel, 1995. , 
The Inner World of Jimi Hendrix, by Monika Dannemann, St. Martin's Press, New York, 1995. 
Jimi Hendrix: The Ultimate Experience, by Adrian Boot and Chris Salewicz, London, Boxtree, 1995. 
Philadelphia Photo Review, portfolio, Prison Tattoos, the Stations of the Body, volume 19, number 4, Fall 1996
Westerns, by Lee Clark Mitchell, University of Chicago Press, 1996. 
A Borderless Vision: A Douglas Kent Hall Retrospective, catalog for Solo Exhibition, Wiegand Gallery, Belmont, CA, 1997
Larry Bell: Zones of Experience, two essays, Albuquerque, The Albuquerque Museum, 1997, Library of Congress Catalogue No. 94-12045
Eyewitness: The Illustrated Jimi Hendrix Concerts, 1969–1970, compiled by Ben Valkhoff, Up from the Skies Unlimited, Nijmegen, the Netherlands, 1997, p. 80. 
Master Breasts, Aperture, New York, NY, 1998, pp. 4–5. 
History of Photography: A Bibliography of Books, vol. 4, Laurent Roosens and Luc Salu, Mansell, 1999, p. 140. .
23. International Biennial of Graphic Arts/Mednarodni Graficni Bienale, Ljubljana, Slovenia, 1999
Leslie Marmon SIlko, University of New Mexico Press, 1999, cover photograph. 
"Toughest Indian in the World," by Sherman Alexie, The New Yorker, June 21, 1999, p. 96, Douglas Kent Hall photograph 
Tamarind: Forty Years, by Marge Devon, University of New Mexico Press, 2000, p. 145. 
Spider Woman: A Story of Navajo Weavers and Chanters, Gladys Reichard, University of New Mexico Press, 2001, cover photograph. 
Alvin Lee & Ten Years After, by Herb Staehr, Hingham, MA, Free Street Press, 2001. 
New Mexico Magazine, Master's Showcase, July 2001
Chokecherries 2001 (Cover photo), SOMOS, Taos, NM, 2002
Magnifico: Art of Albuquerque: A World of Paint and Polish, catalog essay, August 2002
Tony Price Atomic Artist, catalog essay, The Museum of Fine Arts, Santa Fe, NM, "Dancing to the Music: Tony Price in Retrospect," November 2002. ; 
The Book of War: White Sands, collaborative multimedia artist book. Portfolio of Douglas Kent Hall photographs of White Sands, and DVD/CD of Douglas Kent Hall poetry read by Douglas Kent Hall with music composed and recorded by Devon Hall, composer, 2002
The Social Lens, University Art Museum, Albuquerque, NM, July 2003
Just You Just Me: The Art of Lily Fenichel, catalog essay, Harwood Museum of Art, Taos, NM, 2004. ; 
Amazing Men, photographs by Joyce Tenneson, Bulfinch, New York, 2004. 
Classic Hendrix, Genesis Publications, Surrey, England, 2004 ; 
New Mexico 24/7, DK Publishing, New York, 2004, pp. 65, 66, 70–71, 107, 110, 120–21.  
Dugout, by Terry Allen, Austin, University of Texas Press, 2005. 
Carl*s Cars Magazine, Photographic Portfolio and Interview, "Van People." Issue 12, Summer 2005, Oslo, Norway
Room Full of Mirrors: A Biography of Jimi Hendrix, by Charles Cross, Hyperion, 2005, insert p. 9.  
Carl*s Cars Magazine, Cover and Photographic Portfolio, "Passing." Issue 14, Winter 2005, Oslo, Norway
Biennale Internazionale Dell'arte Contemporanea, Quinta Edizione, Florence Biennale, Italy, 2005
Essentials of Argument, by Nancy V. Wood, Pearson/Prentice Hall, NJ, 2006, border photograph. 
Hope: Preserving Tibetan Culture, Dalai Lama Benefit, CoolGreySeven/Dalai Lama Norbulinka Institute, 2006
Jimi Hendrix: An Illustrated Experience, Janie L. Hendrix and John McDermott, New York and London, Atria Books, 2007. ; 
Green, Inaugural Exhibition, essay by Sharyn Udall, 516 Arts, Albuquerque, NM, 2007
El Palacio, excerpt from In New Mexico Light, 6 pages, Fall 2007
Iconic America, Tommy Hilfiger with George Lois, New York, Rizzoli/Universe, November 2007. 
Insights: The Portraiture Of Charles R. Rushton, Nabee-Gerrer Museum of Art, Norman Oklahoma, 2008. 
Titans: Muhammad Ali and Arnold Schwarzenegger, photographs by Al Satterwhite, essay contributions by Douglas Kent Hall, Dalton Watson Fine Art Books, 2008. 
Mass: Of This World: The Art of Alan Paine Radebaugh, Radebaugh Fine Art, Albuquerque 2008
Photography: New Mexico, essays by Kristin Barendsen, Fresco Fine Art Publishers, 2008. 
Thirty Year Selected Retrospective, Midwestern State University Art Gallery, Wichita Falls, TX, 2008
Illumination: The Paintings of Georgia O'Keeffe, Agnes Pelton, Agnes Martin, and Florence Miller Pierce, Orange County Museum of Art, Newport Beach, CA, 2009. 
Rangefinder, portfolio of eight photographs, article by Paul Slaughter, March 2009
Raymond Carver: A Life, Carl Sklenicka, Scribner, 2009. 
Terry Allen, University of Texas Press, 2010. 
College of Notre Dame People: Douglas Kent Hall, Textstream, 2010. ; 
Day out of Days, Sam Shepard, Vintage Books, 2011, p. 50. . See also The Wall Street Journal, December 2–3, 2017, Books section.  
Perspectives on Argument, by Nancy V. Wood and James Miller, Pearson Education, NJ, 2011, border photograph. 
The Rolling Stones in Portugal, Rolando Rebolo, Zebra Publicações, 2011
Larry Bell, Carré d'Arte–Musée d'art contemporain de Nîmes, France, 2011. 
Princeton University Library Chronicle, vol. LXXIII, Autumn 2011, announcement of the acquisition of the Douglas Kent Hall Papers
Hendrix on Hendrix: Encounters and Interviews with Jimi Hendrix, Steven Roby, Chicago Review Press, 2012. 
Total Recall, Arnold Schwarzenegger, Simon and Schuster, 2012, pp. 226–27. 
"Top Five Iconic Music Photos," photo of Eric Clapton and Ginger Baker by Douglas Kent Hall, Elmore Magazine, issue 59, November/December 2013 
Princeton University Library Chronicle, "Photography and the Princeton Collections of Western Americana," by Gabriel A. Swift, vol. LXXV, no. 2, Winter 2014, pp. 242–43
20th Century Photographers, Grace Schaub, Routledge, 2015, pp. 99–106. 
Visualizing Albuquerque: Art of Central New Mexico, Joseph Traugott, Albuquerque Museum, 2015. 
100 Years of Tattoos, David McComb, London: Laurence King Publishing, 2016. 
75 Years of Capitol Records, edited by Reuel Golden, Taschen, 2017, pp. 299, 483. 
 "The Ascetic," by Dan Chiasson, The New Yorker, September 18, 2017, photograph of W. S. Merwin by Douglas Kent Hall, p. 67

References

External links
 
The Douglas Kent Hall Papers at Princeton University

1938 births
2008 deaths
20th-century American novelists
20th-century American poets
21st-century American novelists
21st-century American poets
American male novelists
American male poets
20th-century American photographers
Artists from Albuquerque, New Mexico
Brigham Young University alumni
Iowa Writers' Workshop alumni
Writers from Albuquerque, New Mexico
People from Vernal, Utah
University of Utah alumni
Utah State University alumni
Writers from Santa Fe, New Mexico
American male essayists
Fine art photographers
21st-century American essayists
20th-century essayists
20th-century American male writers
21st-century American male writers